The Cooperativa Hidroeléctrica de la Montaña is the first electric energy cooperative in Puerto Rico.​ Their purpose is to generate and distribute cost effective and resilient energy from renewable sources for the communities and businesses from the Adjuntas, Jayuya, Lares and Utuado municipalities. The efforts of the Cooperativa Hidroeléctrica de la Montaña are directed to guarantee cost effective, clean and resilient energy to the residents of these communities, using a democratic model.

Foundation 
The alternative of organizing and promoting the Cooperativa Hidroeléctrica de la Montaña arises from the leadership of Unidos por Utuado Inc., which organized volunteers who went out to fight for their communities. The leaders of Unidos por Utuado Inc. witnessed the vulnerability of the community of the Cordillera Central who were forced to wait up to a year to recover electricity service. Due to the need in the town, and with the commitment to serve the residents of the Cordillera Central, the leaders began to elaborate this idea of ​​creating the first electrical cooperative in Puerto Rico. This cooperative would provide the towns of central Puerto Rico with cost-effective, stable, and resilient electricity, as well as create an engine of economic development for these towns of the center, opening the opportunity for communities to be part of the transformation of the energy system through the cooperative model. The concept of the electric cooperative is based on recovering the operation of the hydroelectric plants of Lake Dos Bocas and Caonillas.

Important Dates 
December 2018

The Governor of Puerto Rico signs Law 258, the Puerto Rico Energy Cooperatives Law. This law makes possible the development of the Cooperativa Hidroeléctrica de la Montaña as an electric energy cooperative instead of a mixed cooperative that is already in formation.

April 2019

The Authority for Public-Private Partnerships issues a Request for Qualifications for the Puerto Rico Hydroelectric Power Plants Revitalization Project (RFQ 2019-2) that offers a concession to rehabilitate and manage all hydroelectric plants in Puerto Rico.

July 2019

The Cooperativa Hidroeléctrica de la Montaña celebrates the delivery of the declaration of qualifications to the Authority for Public-Private Partnerships (AAPP) to operate the plants located in the Dos Bocas and Caonillas lakes in Utuado.

August 2019

The Cooperativa Hidroeléctrica de la Montaña is incorporated with the Department of State, becoming the first Electric Power Cooperative in Puerto Rico.

October 2019

The organization Unidos por Utuado denounces that the Cooperativa Hidroeléctrica de la Montaña is paralyzed by the bureaucracy of the Public-Private Partnerships Authority and threatens the project that would bring renewable energy to Utuado, Adjuntas and Jayuya.

June 2020

The Cooperativa Hidroeléctrica de la Montaña is selected with special recognition for the best renewable energy project and its commitment to citizenship by the Puerto Rico Chamber of Commerce.

December 2020

The United States Internal Revenue Service (IRS) designates the Cooperativa Hidroeléctrica de la Montaña as a tax-exempt non-profit organization, becoming the first organization in Puerto Rico to receive a 501(c) designation. )(12).

May 2022

The Cooperativa Hidroeléctrica de la Montaña wins the Inclusive Energy Innovation Award.

As part of the ReEnFoCo project, the Cooperativa Hidroeléctrica de la Montaña inaugurated the first microgrid in Poblado Castañer through the installation of a photovoltaic system.

June 2022

The Microrred de la Montaña is one of 12 projects in remote communities that were selected for the Department of Energy's Energy Transitions Initiative Partnership Project (ETIPP).

Projects 
The Cooperativa Hidroeléctrica de la Montaña counts with three projects.

Hidroenergía Renace 
Hidroenergía Renace consists of the acquisition, rehabilitation and management of the Caonillas and Dos Bocas hydroelectric plants. Puerto Rico's hydroelectric system operates well below its capacity due to a historical problem of lack of maintenance, which was aggravated by damage from the Hurricanes Irma and María. The Mountain Hydroelectric Cooperative proposes the rescue of the Dos Bocas and Caonillas plants to provide the mountain with 43 megawatts of reliable and renewable energy.

ReEnFoCo 
The project Reenfoco has the objective of installing photovoltaic systems in remote areas through a contribution from the Interstate Renewable Energy Council. This project aims to improve the lives of residents in the region with a first phase, which represents the installation of photovoltaic systems for businesses, community centers and residences located at strategic intersections. Each installed photovoltaic system will create Resilience Centers so that the community has access to electricity during periods of grid failure.

Microrred de la Montaña 
The project Microrred de la Montaña seeks to be the first intermunicipal microgrid in Puerto Rico. According to its promoters, the project will combine generation from hydroelectric plants and photovoltaic systems to power new 38-kilovolt lines between the towns of Adjuntas, Jayuya, Lares, and Utuado. The project would help the cooperative provide resilient and affordable power to residents. of four remote inland mountain communities. It is one of 12 projects in remote and island communities that were competitively selected to strengthen energy infrastructure and reduce the risk of outages. The project seeks to ensure that residents have essential services in what the community manages to replenish after a disaster or any situation.

References

External links 

 
 https://aeepr.com/es-pr/QuienesSomos/Paginas/Historia.aspx
 http://www.recursosaguapuertorico.com/INFORME_EMBALSES_2MAR04_1_.pdf
 https://issuu.com/coleccionpuertorriquena/docs/g_nesis_y_desarrollo_de_los_sistema

Electric cooperatives of the United States
Electric power companies of Puerto Rico